The Federal Noxious Weed Act of 1974 ("FNWA") established a federal program to control the spread of noxious weeds. The United States Secretary of Agriculture was given the authority to declare plants "noxious weeds", and limit the interstate spread of such plants without a permit. The Secretary has the authority to inspect, seize, and destroy products, and quarantine areas, if necessary to contain, or limit the spread of such weeds.

Amended in 1990 
The Act was amended by the 1990 Farm Bill on November 28, 1990.  The amendment requires that each federal land-managing agency, including the Bureau of Land Management, the National Park Service, the U.S. Fish and Wildlife Service, and the U.S. Forest Service, do the following:
Designate an office or person adequately trained in managing undesirable plant species to develop and coordinate a program to control such plants on the agency's land;
Establish and adequately fund this plant management program through the agency's budget process;
Complete and implement cooperative agreements (requirements for which are provided) with the States regarding undesirable plants on agency land; and
Establish integrated management systems (as defined in the Act) to control or contain undesirable plants targeted under the cooperative agreements.

Superseded in 2000 
The Act was superseded in 2000 by the Plant Protection Act on June 20, 2000, except for the introductory section of the FNWA, and the amendment of 1990 (section 15,  note and ).

External links
 Federal Noxious Weed Act, via fws.gov
 Noxious Weed list, via aphis.usda.gov
 Plant Protection Act, via aphis.usda.gov
 Federal Noxious Weeds, via United States Department of Agriculture
 The California Invasive Plant Council

1975 in law
United States federal environmental legislation
1975 in the environment
1975 in the United States